Below is a list of mayors of Sunderland in the United Kingdom (borough from 1836, metropolitan borough from 1974 to 1992 and City of Sunderland from 1992 to present)

Mayors of Sunderland

 1836-37 Andrew White
 1837-38 Richard Spoor
 1838-39 Joseph Simpson
 1839-40 Joseph Brown
 1840-41 Richard White
 1841-42 Sir Hedworth Williamson, 7th Baronet
 1842-43 Andrew White
 1843-44 Robert Burdon Cay
 1844-45 James Allison
 1845-47 Robert Brown
 1847 Sir Hedworth Williamson, 7th Baronet
 1847-48 John Scott
 1848-49 Joseph Simpson
 1849-50 William Ord
 1850-51 William Mordey
 1851-53 James Hartley
 1853-54 Samuel Alcock
 1854-56 Anthony John Moore
 1856-58 George Smith Ranson
 1858-59 John Candlish
 1859-61 Samuel Alcock
 1861-62 John Candlish
 1862-63 James Hartley
 1863-64 James Allison
 1864-66 Edward Temperley Gourley
 1866-67 John James Kayll
 1867-68 Edward Temperley Gourley
 1868-69 John Crossley
 1869-70 William Thompson
 1870-72 William Nicholson
 1872-74 Alexander George McKenzie
 1874-75 John Potts
 1875-76 John Nicholson
 1876-78 Samuel Storey
 1878-79 Samuel Sinclair Robson
 1879-80 Thomas Scott Turnbull
 1880 Samuel Storey
 1880-82 William Wilson
 1882-84 John Wright Wayman
 1884-86 Robert Preston
 1886-88 Edwin Richardson
 1888-89 George Barnes
 1889-91 Robert Shadforth
 1891-93 Stansfield Richardson
 1893-95 John Sanderson
 1895-97 William Burns
 1897-99 William Bruce
 1899-1900 Edwin Robert Dix
 1900-02 John George Kirtley
 1902-04 Henry John Turnbull (Liberal)
 1904-06 Frederick Foster
 1906-07 Stephen Moriarty Swan
 1907-08 William Walker
 1908-10 Arthur F. Young
 1910-11 William Sanderson
 1911-12 Edward Hazard Brown
 1912-17 Stansfield Richardson
 1917-19 William Frederick Vint
 1919-20 Arthur Ritson
 1920 William Frederick Vint
 1920-22 Walter Raine
 1922-24 George Stephenson Lawson
 1924-26 John Spours Nicholson
 1926-28 David Cairns
 1928-30 Isaac Gibson Modlin
 1930-33 Edward Hazard Brown
 1933-35 Edward William Ditchburn
 1935-37 Thomas Summerbell
 1937-38 James Turner
 1938 George Ford
 1938-43 Myers Wayman
 1943-44 Wilton Legender Milburn
 1944-45 John Young
 1945-46 Joshua Ritson
 1946-47 Miles Walton
 1947-49 Eden Johnston
 1949-50 Jacob "Jack" Cohen
 1950-51 George Henry Morgan
 1951-52 William Harvey
 1952-53 Arthur Humphrey Suddick
 1953-54 McGregor Ernest English
 1954-55 Jane Huggins
 1955-56 Edith Evelyn Blacklock
 1956-57 Thomas Henry Cavanagh
 1957-58 Joseph Hoy
 1958-59 Edwin Ernest Wales
 1959-60 Nicholas Lister Allison
 1960-61 Joseph Tweddle
 1961-62 Kitty Cohen
 1962-63 Richard Thomas Weston
 1963-64 Jane Ellen Hedley
 1964-65 Robert Wilkinson
 1965-66 Albert Watson
 1966-67 Fred Young
 1967-68 Norman Waters
 1968-69 John William Purvis Wilkinson
 1969-70 Mary Elizabeth Miller
 1970-71 William Ord Stephenson
 1971-72 William Sinclair Martin
 1972-73 Leslie Watson
 1973-74 George Conforth Park
 1974-75 Tony Burgham|Anthony "Tony" Burgham
 1975-76 Mary Elizabeth Porter
 1976-77 Charles Henry Slater
 1977-78 Thomas Bridges
 1978-79 Arthur Lumley
 1979 E Weir
 1979-81 Leonard Harper
 1981-82 Thomas Megan Finnigan
 1982-83 Joseph Hall
 1983-84 Annie Pratt
 1984-85 George Elliott
 1985-86 Ralph Carroll Baxter
 1986-87 Thomas Scott
 1987-88 John Mawston
 1988-89 Leslie Mann
 1989-90 Robert Kirby
 1990-91 Andrew Watson Myers
 1991-92 David Francis Thompson
 1992-93 William Craddock
 1993-94 Bryan Charlton
 1994-95 Denis Gerard Whalen
 1995-96 Eric Bramfitt
 1996-97 Ian Galbraith
 1997-98 Gowan James Scott
 1998-99 Walter Scott
 1999-2000 David Ross Wares
 2000-01 Brian Dodds
 2001-02 Ken Murray
 2002-03 Peter Gibson
 2003-04 Juliana Heron
 2004-05 James B Scott
 2005-06 Bill Stephenson
 2006-07 Thomas Foster
 2007-08 Leslie Scott
 2008-09 Mary Smith
 2009-10 Dennis Richardson
 2010-11 Thomas Martin
 2011-12 Norma Wright
 2012-13 Iain Kay
 2013-14 Robert Heron
 2014-15 Stuart Porthouse
 2015-16 Barry Curran
 2016-17 Alan Emerson
 2017-18 Doris MacKnight
 2018–present Lynda Scanlan

References
 Former Mayors of Sunderland

Sunderland
City of Sunderland